Prakash (film director) is a Kannada film director who made commercially successful movies like Milana, Vamshi, Khushi, and more.

Career

He entered Kannada film industry renouncing Investment banker job in United Kingdom. He debuted Kannada film industry as a director and script-writer with movie Khushi starring Vijay Raghavendra (cousin Brother) and continued making four films with Vijay Raghavendra. He directed two popular movies with his cousin-brother Puneeth Rajkumar - movie Milana ran for a year in Kannada theatres, including another hit movie Vamshi.

He also produced a popular Kannada teleserial Lakumi on his home banner - Jai Mata Combines[Sri Jaimatha Combines].

Filmography

Notes

External links
 Remake of a popular Malayalam film 'Traffic' - Prakash
 Top 10 Puneeth Rajkumar Hit Kannada Movies in Box Office Report
 Prakash
 HIGH EXPECTATIONS ON ‘GOKULA’

Kannada film directors
Living people
Film directors from Karnataka
21st-century Indian film directors
Year of birth missing (living people)